Cheshmeh Mahi (also Romanized as Cheshmeh Māhī; also known as Sāmān) is a village in Helilan Rural District, Helilan District, Chardavol County, Ilam Province, Iran. At the 2006 census, its population was 816, in 161 families. The village is populated by Kurds.

References 

Populated places in Chardavol County
Kurdish settlements in Ilam Province